This is a list of people who have walked across Canada from the east coast to the west coast or vice versa. Walking or running across Canada has long been pursued as a way to seek notoriety or bring publicity to social causes.

1921 Halifax Herald Coast to Coast Race
This was an informal race across Canada fueled by the Halifax Herald newspaper. In 1921, Jack Behan and his son, Clifford, of Dartmouth, NS, Jennie and Frank Dill (husband and wife) of Windsor, NS, and Charles Burkman of Whitewood, SK, all walked from Halifax, NS to Vancouver, BC.  In order of arrival in Vancouver, the Behans completed the walk in 136 days, the Dills in 134 days, and Burkman in 139 days.  Although the Behans were the first to reach Vancouver, the Dills did not leave until seven days after the Behans began their walk. This trek was followed-up by the Behans and Dills attempting a race from Montreal, QC to Halifax.

Jennie Dill
Jennie (Jenny) Dill was the first woman to walk across Canada.  See 1921 Halifax Herald Coast to Coast Race.

Steve Fonyo

Steve Fonyo ran across Canada in 1984–1985 and raised $14 million for cancer research. Fonyo began his Journey for Lives run on 31 March 1984 at age 18 and completed it 425 days later on 29 May 1985, covering . In recognition, he was named an Officer of the Order of Canada in 1985.

Trevor Redmond
Trevor Redmond walked for cancer prevention, research and awareness between 2006 and 2007. He covered 11,421 kilometers. In 2009, he completed a 14,632 kilometer bicycle ride across Canada and Back over a 3 month period. Trevor is continuing his effort while currently living in Halifax, with intent to complete a run across Canada as well. Trevor intends to begin his Run of Faith on March 26, 2024 for Health, Mobility and Recovery for Everyone. Trevor now calls himself, the Fellow in Yellow, by wearing yellow as he meets the public. A link to Trevor’s website is still active for some details. https://www.thereandbackcanada.ca/

Beresford Greatheed
Beresford Greatheed was the first person to walk across Canada.  He made his journey in 1895: departing Vancouver, BC on 2 March 1895 and arriving in Halifax, NS twelve months later. Greatheed's cross-Canada walk was intended to be the first leg in a walk around the world that he undertook to win $50,000.  According to an article in the 24 August 1891 edition of The Times (London), "...two clubs in Vancouver, The Union and Vancouver, wagered $50,000 on whether a man could walk around the world in five years living without money or luggage and depending entirely upon his own exertions."  Greatheed took up the challenge.

John Hugh Gillis

In 1906, on a bet and a dare, John Hugh Gillis walked from North Sydney, NS to Vancouver, BC.  While some have reported him to be the first person to cross Canada on foot, that honour belongs to Beresford Greatheed. Gillis departed North Sydney on 31 January 1906 with two companions, both of whom left his company in Montréal, QC. Near Ignace, ON he was joined by Charles Jackman. Jackman had begun his walk in Montréal on 14 April with the goal of catching up to and overtaking Gillis.  The two of them walked 2,700 km together and strode into Vancouver station at midnight 24 September 1906.

Rick Hansen

As part of his Man in Motion World Tour, a 26-month trek in a wheelchair to create awareness of the potential of people with disabilities and to find a cure for paralysis after spinal cord injury, Rick Hansen logged 40,075 km through 34 countries on four continents (North America, Europe, Oceania, and Asia) before crossing Canada. His cross-Canada ride started in Cape Spear, NL on 26 August 1986 and finished on 22 May 1987 in Vancouver. 2 years, 2 months and two days averaging 80 kilometes per day.

Steve Hartwig
Steve Hartwig, a Canadian Armed Forces veteran suffering from PTSD that resulted from a posting to the war zone in the former Yugoslavia, walked from Vancouver, BC to St. John's, NL in 2014.  He left Vancouver on 23 June 2014 and arrived in St. John's on 13 Sept.  Each day on the journey he walked a 32-km forced march, also called a military hike.  He undertook the walk to raise awareness of PTSD and entitled his walk, "Into No Man's Land".

Burnest Heard
Burnest Heard (born Burnest Watson Heard Wozny), the self-styled "World's Greatest Lover", walked from Vancouver, BC to Halifax, NS and back.  Heard set out on 1 June 1937 and arrived in Halifax 19 months later, in December 1939.  He pushed a 150-pound oil drum across the country to make it clear that he did not hitch-hike during his journey.  Heard paid for his trip by selling postcards of himself, at 10 cents apiece (he claimed to have sold 18,000 of them); staying in hotels and buying his own food.  After a rest in Halifax, he began his return trip on 1 February 1940 and took two years and ten months to reach Vancouver (in December 1942).  His first cross-country transit was widely reported in newspapers all over the US and Canada; however, his return journey was only featured in the Canadian press.

Al Howie

In 1991, Al Howie ran from St. John's, NL to Victoria, BC in 72 days, 10 hours and 23 minutes; departing St. John's on 21 June and arriving in Victoria on 1 September. His 7295.5 km transit (100 km a day for 72 days) is recognised by Guinness World Records as the fastest crossing of Canada on foot (male).

Ann Keane 
In 2002, Ann Keane ran from St. John's, NL to Tofino, BC in 143 days; departing St. John's on 17 April and arriving in Tofino on 8 September. Her 7,831 km transit is recognised by Guinness World Records as the fastest crossing of Canada on foot (female).

Jamie McDonald 

In 2013–2014, Jamie McDonald ran across Canada (wearing a Flash costume) and raised a quarter of a million British pounds for children’s charities.  He was born with the rare spinal condition syringomyelia, and at nine years old was told by doctors he would be unable to walk.  Fortunately, McDonald's symptoms “gradually disappeared”.  In 2014, while on a visit to Canada, he decided to run across the country.  At the beginning of his journey, he ran about 10–13 miles a day but with his tourist visa and winter kicking in (at which point several areas reached minus 40 degrees) after a couple of months, he ran approximately a marathon a day.  He began his journey in St John's, NL on 9 March 2013 and arrived in Vancouver, BC on 4 February 2014.

Skylar Roth-MacDonald 
Skylar Roth-MacDonald ran across Canada in 2021 to raise $50,000 and awareness for the Canadian Mental Health Association. He set out from Victoria, BC on 1 June 2021 and completed his run 143 days later in St. John's, NL on 12 October. He ran more than 7,200 km and raised more than $65,000.

Sébastien Sasseville 
Sébastien Sasseville ran across Canada in 2014 to raise awareness about living with diabetes. He left St. John’s, NL on 2 February 2014 and arrived in Vancouver, BC on 14 November 2014, World Diabetes Day. His nine month journey was the equivalent of 5 or 6 marathons each week.

Melanie Vogel 
Melanie Vogel became the first woman to complete a coast-to-coast-to-coast through-hike on the Trans Canada Trail. She started her journey in Cape Spear, NL on 2 June 2017 and completed her 20,000 km journey at Point Zero of the Trans Canada Trail at Clover Point in Victoria, BC on 12 November 2022.  In addition to walking from the Atlantic to the Pacific oceans, she also traveled north to the Arctic ocean; following the Trans Canada Trail.

She was recognised by the Royal Canadian Geographical Society, who awarded her with a Women’s Expedition Grant in 2019. The duration of Vogel's trek was extended due to the COVD-19 pandemic.

Michael Yellowlees 
Michael Yellowlees completed an 8,000-kilometre fundraising walk across Canada on 5 December 2021 when he arrived at Cape Spear on the eastern edge of Newfoundland.  He began his walk in Tofino, BC at the start on 5 March 2021.  He raised more than $60,000 for the Trees for Life charity.  Yellowlees was accompanied by Luna, his Husky dog.

See also
 Transcontinental walk
 List of people who have run across Australia
 List of people who have walked across Australia
 Twenty-first-century fundraising walks in Tasmania
 List of people who have walked across the United States

References

Lists of people by activity
Canada-related lists